The Long Island Open is a professional golf tournament played on Long Island, New York. It is sponsored by the Long Island Golf Association and was first held in 1922 at the Cherry Valley Club in Garden City, New York.

History 
The Long Island Open was a PGA Tour-level event in the 1920s and 1930s. Al Brosch won a record ten titles between 1939 and 1959, a record that stands today.

Winners

Source:

References 

Former PGA Tour events
Golf in New York (state)
Sports in Long Island
Recurring sporting events established in 1922
1922 establishments in New York (state)